Beiler is a surname of German origin. Notable people with the surname include:

Anna Fisher Beiler (1848–1904), British-born American missionary, newspaper editor
Anne F. Beiler (born 1949), American businesswoman
Egon Beiler (born 1953), Canadian sport wrestler
Nadine Beiler (born 1990), Austrian singer

See also

 Byler (disambiguation)